Phua Kok Khoo is a Singaporean publisher, academic, and philanthropist.

About
Phua is the son of late Teochew merchant and community figure Phua Chay Long. Graduated from the University of Birmingham with a PhD in Mathematical Physics in 1970, he is Chairman and Editor-in-Chief of World Scientific Publishing, Asia's largest international scientific publishing company, which he founded in Singapore in 1981. He is the founding director of the Institute of Advanced Studies at Nanyang Technological University, as well as an adjunct professor in the Department of Physics at the National University of Singapore.

In 2009 Phua was elected as  Fellow of the American Physical Society for his contributions to research and education in physics. He was awarded the American Physical Society President's Award by the institute of Physics Singapore Council in 2006, for his contributions to physics research and education in Singapore. Phua was awarded the honorary degree of Doctor of Science (DSc) by the University of Birmingham in Singapore in 2013. In 2014 Phua donated e-books worth £1 million to the University of Birmingham's new library.

References

Alumni of the University of Birmingham
Academic staff of the National University of Singapore
Living people
Singaporean people of Teochew descent
Fellows of the American Physical Society
Singaporean businesspeople
Year of birth missing (living people)